The Institute of Biomedical Problems (IMBP, also IBMP) is an institution of the Russian Academy of Sciences. The IMBP is the leading organization in Russia for conducting fundamental research in the field of space biology and medicine; medical and biological support of crewed space flights; development of methods and means of ensuring safety and life, preserving health and maintaining human performance in extreme conditions. Founded in 1963, it is based at 76a, Khoroshevskoe Shosse in Moscow. , its director is Oleg Igorevich Orlov.

It is known in the West particularly for the MARS-500 experiment simulating crewed flight to Mars.

See also 
 RAS Department of Physiological Sciences

References

External links 
 http://www.imbp.ru/

Institutes of the Russian Academy of Sciences
1963 establishments in the Soviet Union
Space medicine
Medical research institutes in the Soviet Union
Soviet and Russian space institutions
Space technology research institutes
Research institutes established in 1963